The Chaos Lacrosse Club is a professional men's field lacrosse team in Premier Lacrosse League (PLL). The Chaos are one of the six founding members of the PLL for the 2019 season. Notable players include Blaze Riorden, Josh Byrne, Jarrod Neumann and Troy Reh. Chaos were crowned PLL Champions for the first time in team history with a 14 - 9 victory over the Whipsnakes in the 2021 PLL Championship.

Roster

*Indicates player is on Unavailable to Travel list

**Indicates player is on Physically Unable to Perform list

^Indicates player is on Military list

(C) indicates captain

Coaching staff
 Head coach – Andy Towers
 Assistant coach – Ryan Curtis
 Assistant coach – Matt Panetta

All-time draft selections
2019

2020 Entry Draft

The 2020 player entry draft occurred on March 16 for teams to select players arriving from rival Major League Lacrosse. On March 4, Paul Burmeister and NBCSN hosted an entry draft lottery for selection order. Out of 100 balls to select from, Waterdogs had 40, Chrome had 25, Atlas had 15, Archers had 10, Chaos had 6, Redwoods had 3, and the champion Whipsnakes had 1.

Rob Pannell was announced to be transferring to the PLL on March 9, followed by 15 other players the following day, which comprised the selection pool for the entry draft. A total of 14 players were selected in the entry draft with remaining new players entering the league player pool.

2020 College Draft

2021 Entry Draft

2021 College Draft

2022 College Draft

Season results

PLL Award Winners
Jim Brown Most Valuable Player
 Blaze Riorden: 2021
Dave Pietramala Defensive Player of the Year
 Jarrod Neumann: 2019
Oren Lyons Goalie of the Year
 Blaze Riorden: 2019, 2020, 2021
Dick Edell Coach of the Year
 Andy Towers: 2019
Jimmy Regan Teammate of the Year
 Mark Glicini: 2019

Head coaches

All-time record vs. PLL Clubs

References

Premier Lacrosse League teams
Lacrosse clubs established in 2019